The AC Petite is a three-wheeled British microcar with a rear-mounted  Villiers single cylinder, two-stroke engine.

There were two versions of the car. Between 1953 and 1955 the car was fitted with a Villiers 27B engine and two different sizes of wheel; the rears were  spoked wheels whilst the front was only .  In 1955 a Mark II version was launched, incorporating minor changes to the exterior trim, a slightly more powerful Villiers 28B engine and  wheels front and rear.

Approximately 4,000 AC Petites were built.

See also
List of microcars by country of origin
AC Thundersley Invacar
AC Autocarrier

References

Citations

Bibliography

External links

Petite
Microcars
Three-wheeled motor vehicles
Cars introduced in 1953
Rear-wheel-drive vehicles
Rear-engined vehicles